KTGR (1580 AM) is a radio station broadcasting a sports format, with programming from the ESPN Radio network. Licensed to Columbia, Missouri, United States, the station serves the Columbia, Missouri, area.  The station is currently owned by Zimmer Radio Group of Mid-Missouri.

History

The station was assigned the call letters KBIA by the FCC on October 7, 1954, and began broadcasting in April 1955. Owner Cecil W. Roberts was a former newspaper publisher from Farmington, Mo., who eventually built a chain of a dozen radio stations in six states, all jointly owned by Roberts and his wife, Jane A. Roberts. KBIA became the third radio station in Columbia, joining KFRU (1925) and KOWS 1240 (1937). 

As an affiliate of the Missouri Sports Network, KBIA carried University of Missouri football games in 1960. 

The station was sold in April 1961 to Barrington Broadcasting Co. for $90,000 (principals were Aubrey D. Reid and his wife, who owned WEW-AM in St. Louis, Mo., and WKYB-AM and WKYB-FM in Paducah, Ky.) In June 1961, the call letters were changed to KCGM. 

In November 1966, a subsequent owner, Tiger Broadcasting Co., changed the call letters to KTGR.

Translators
In addition to the main station, KTGR is relayed by an additional translator to widen its broadcast area.

References

External links

Radio Broadcasting History: KTGR

TGR